In mathematics, the q-Charlier polynomials are a family of basic hypergeometric orthogonal polynomials in the basic Askey scheme.  give a detailed list of their properties.

Definition

The polynomials are given in terms of the basic hypergeometric function by

References

Orthogonal polynomials
Q-analogs
Special hypergeometric functions